Ocean Drive is a series of local roads in southern New Jersey, connecting Atlantic City to Cape May along barrier islands on the Atlantic Ocean. It consists of several roads and includes all five toll bridges owned by the Cape May County Bridge Commission.

Route description

Ocean Drive begins in Cape May Point, and its southern terminus is split among two separate roads.  One branch of Ocean Drive begins on Sunset Boulevard (County Route 606) at its dead end and travels for 0.5 miles.  The second branch of Ocean Drive begins on Cape Avenue (County Route 651) at Lincoln Avenue, and travels for 0.7 miles.  The two branches meet at an intersection, and Ocean Drive continues along CR 606 into the City of Cape May.  At the end of CR 606, Ocean Drive turns south along Broadway (CR 626), then heads east along Beach Avenue (CR 604).  Ocean Drive travels along the coast to Pittsburg Avenue (CR 622), and heads north along to CR 622 to its terminus at Lafayette Street (NJ 109), and continues north again.

It crosses the Cape May Canal into Lower Township and makes a right turn onto County Route 621.  At this point, Ocean Drive signage begins. It then crosses over the Middle Thorofare Bridge (toll southbound) and continues north into Wildwood Crest. Ocean Drive follows CR 621 through the length of The Wildwoods, passing through Wildwood Crest, Wildwood (where it intersects New Jersey Route 47), and finally continuing into North Wildwood.  In North Wildwood, CR 621 ends and Ocean Drive follows New Jersey Route 147 into Middle Township.

It then turns right onto County Route 619 and crosses over the Grassy Sound Bridge (toll northbound) and then the Stone Harbor Bridge into Stone Harbor. Ocean Drive follows CR 619 north through Stone Harbor's 3rd Avenue and into Avalon on Ocean Drive (at 80th St. 3rd Avenue Turns Into Ocean Drive). It then crosses over the Townsends Inlet Bridge (toll southbound) and continues north through Sea Isle City. It then heads through the Strathmere section of Upper Township before crossing the Strathmere Bascule Bridge (toll northbound) and Corson's Inlet Bridge into Ocean City.

Ocean Drive continues to follow CR 619 north through Ocean City before meeting County Route 623. It then follows CR 623 for several blocks to the northwest on 34th Street before following County Route 656 (Bay Avenue) through downtown Ocean City, where it crosses 9th Street, which provides access to New Jersey Route 52.  Ocean Drive then crosses the Ocean City-Longport Bridge (toll southbound) over the Great Egg Harbor Bay into Egg Harbor Township, Atlantic County.

Upon entering Atlantic County, Ocean Drive follows the northern approach of the Ocean City-Longport Bridge to New Jersey Route 152. At this point, Ocean Drive signage ends. It then makes a right turn on NJ 152 and follows it to the John F. Kennedy Memorial Bridge over the Intracoastal Waterway into Longport. Ocean Drive then heads north on Atlantic Avenue through Longport, Margate City and Ventnor City.  Atlantic Avenue continues into Atlantic City, and Ocean Drive terminates at the end of Atlantic Avenue in Uptown Atlantic City at N Maine Avenue.

Tolls
The five toll bridges on Ocean Drive charge $2.00 for cars as of February 1, 2022, which can be paid in cash or with E-ZPass. The Middle Thorofare, Townsends Inlet, and Ocean City-Longport bridges have tolls in the southbound direction while the Grassy Sound and Corsons Inlet bridges have northbound tolls. The tolls are slated to rise to $2.50 in February 2023 and $3 in February 2024.

When the Ocean Drive bridges were first built, the toll for cars was 25 cents, charged in both directions at the Middle Thorofare, Grassy Sound, Townsends Inlet, Corsons Inlet, and Ocean City-Longport bridges. Toll hikes occurred in 1978, 1984, and 1988 in order to fund construction projects to the bridges. Following the rebuilding of the Ocean City-Longport Bridge in 2002, that bridge was converted to one-way tolling, with a $1 toll charged to cars in the southbound direction. The other bridges would be converted to one-way tolling by 2002. Tolls were raised to $1.50 on February 1, 2009.

In 2017 the Cape May County Freeholders approved the purchase of E-ZPass equipment to be installed on the bridges from Lower Township to Ocean City. The introduction of E-ZPass was originally planned for June 2017 but was then delayed multiple times. E-ZPass was implemented at the Ocean City-Longport Bridge on April 30, 2018, the Middle Thorofafe Bridge on May 7, 2018, the Grassy Sound Bridge on May 14, 2018, and the Corsons Inlet Bridge and the Townsends Inlet Bridge on May 21, 2018.

History

The Cape May County Bridge Commission was created by the county in 1934 in order to build a series of toll bridges linking the coastal communities of Cape May County. With the creation of this agency, the bridges were to receive federal funding through the New Deal. In 1940, several of the bridges comprising Ocean Drive were built, including the Middle Thorofare Bridge, Grassy Sound Bridge, and Townsends Inlet Bridge. In 1946, the Corsons Inlet Bridge was built and the Ocean City-Longport Bridge, built in 1927, was purchased by the commission, completing the link for the barrier islands between Cape May and Atlantic City.

Along its route, the Ocean Drive followed mostly local roads. The exception was the portion across the Cape May Canal between Cape May Canal and Lower Township, which was initially part of US 9 and Route 4 before becoming US 9 only in 1953 and then Route 109 in the 1970s. By the 1950s and 1960s, most of the remainder of Ocean Drive became part of several county routes. The route between Sunset Beach and Cape May became CR 6 while the spur into Cape May Point became CR 51. Within Cape May, Ocean Drive became CR 26, CR 4, and CR 22 before it joined US 9. Past US 9, it became CR 21 and part of CR 585 before heading through Wildwood Crest and Wildwood along Atlantic Avenue. In North Wildwood, the route became CR 7/CR 585 before turning north into Middle Township and following CR 18/CR 585. Ocean Drive turned north and followed CR 30 through Stone Harbor and Avalon and CR 19 through Sea Isle City and into Ocean City. In Ocean City, Ocean Drive continued north from CR 19 onto Wesley Avenue and Gardens Parkway. Continuing into Atlantic County, the route headed east on CR 20 and entered Longport, where it became CR 29 through Longport, Margate City, and into Ventnor City. North of the Dorset Avenue intersection, Ocean Drive was locally maintained. In 1969, the CR 20 portion of Ocean Drive in Atlantic County became Route 152 and in 1971, the portion of Ocean Drive leading into North Wildwood became a part of Route 147. CR 585 was later removed from Ocean Drive and the remaining county routes in Cape May and Atlantic counties were given numbers in the 600-series. As a result, CR 6 became CR 606, CR 51 became CR 651, CR 26 became CR 626, CR 4 became CR 604, CR 22 became CR 622, CR 21 and CR 7 became CR 621, CR 30 and CR 19 became CR 619 in Cape May County. In Atlantic County, CR 29 became CR 629. In addition, Ocean Drive was modified to use CR 621 through the entirety of The Wildwoods and CR 656 (former CR 56) through the northern part of Ocean City.

Over the years, several of the bridges along Ocean Drive have been reconstructed. In the late 1940s, the Ocean City-Longport Bridge was reconstructed due to poor maintenance from the earlier owner. In 1993, it was determined this bridge needed to be replaced, with the new bridge opening in July 2002. A portion of the old bridge became a fishing pier. In 1998, bonds were issued for improvements to all of the bridges owned by the commission. Bonds were issued in 2005 for construction projects on the Townsends Inlet Bridge and Corsons Inlet Bridge. On September 17, 2018, the Townsends Inlet Bridge closed for a $8.6 million project that will replace the bridge with a new span. The new bridge was expected to open to traffic on May 22, 2019, however, the opening date was pushed back due to more extensive replacement work needing to be done. The Townsends Inlet Bridge reopened on July 25, 2019.

Major intersections

See also

References

External links

Cape May County Bridge Commission

Transportation in Atlantic County, New Jersey
Transportation in Cape May County, New Jersey
Intracoastal Waterway
Toll bridges in New Jersey
U.S. Route 9